The 2003 Christchurch Borough Council election took place on 1 May 2003 to elect members of Christchurch Borough Council in Dorset, England. The whole council was up for election after boundary changes reduced the number of seats by one. The Conservative Party stayed in overall control of the council.

Election result
The Conservatives remained in control of the council after winning 14 of the 24 seats on the council, despite losing three seats. The Liberal Democrats gained three seats to have eight councillors, while two independents were elected.

Ward results

By-elections between 2003 and 2007

Jumpers
A by-election was held in Jumpers ward on 5 May 2005 after the resignation of independent councillor Bob McArthur. The seat was gained for the Liberal Democrats by Jason Viney with a majority of 333 votes over Conservative Trevor Watts.

Portfield
A by-election was held in Portfield on 5 May 2005 following the resignation of councillor Susan Darch due to poor health. Darch had been elected as a Liberal Democrat in 2003, but together with her fellow councillor for Portfied Lillian Jefferis, she subsequently defected to the Conservatives. The seat was regained for the Liberal Democrats by David Vick with a majority of 222 votes over Conservative Tavis Fox.

Purewell and Stanpit
A by-election was held in Purewell and Stanpit on 5 May 2005 after the death of Liberal Democrat councillor Wendy Lloyd. The seat was held for the Liberal Democrats by Alan Wright with a majority of 34 votes over Conservative Nicholas Geary.

References

2003
2003 English local elections